Eric Linn Ormsby (born 1941 in Atlanta, Georgia) is deputy head of academic research and publications at the Institute of Ismaili Studies in London. He was formerly a professor at McGill University Institute of Islamic Studies, where he also served as director. He has published widely on Islamic thought, including Theodicy in Islamic Thought (1984).

Ormsby has had six collections of poetry published, including Bavarian Shrine and Other Poems (1990), which won a Quebec prize for the best poetry of that year. His poems have been published in The New Yorker and The Paris Review, and have been anthologized in The Norton Anthology of Poetry.

Notes

Selected works

West-Eastern Divan: Complete, annotated new translation, including Goethe’s ‘Notes and Essays’ & the unpublished poems, translated by Eric Ormsby, 2019. Gingko

External links 
 

 "Eric Ormsby". The New Yorker.
 "Eric Ormsby — Archive". The New York Sun.
 "Eric Ormsby". QWF literary database of Quebec English-language authors.
 Interview in McGill Reporter
 Review of Facsimiles of Time

1941 births
American male poets
American non-fiction writers
Academic staff of McGill University
Living people
American male non-fiction writers